Avena fatua is a species of grass in the oat genus. It is known as the common wild oat. This oat is native to Eurasia but it has been introduced to most of the other temperate regions of the world. It is naturalized in some areas and considered a noxious weed in others.

Avena fatua is a typical oat in appearance, a green grass with hollow, erect stems 1 to 4 feet (30–120 cm) tall bearing nodding panicles of spikelets. The long dark green leaves are up to a centimeter wide and rough due to small hairs. The seedlings are also hairy. The seed kernel is thinner, longer, darker and hairy when compared with the seed of the common cultivated oat (Avena sativa). This species and other wild oats can become troublesome in prairie agriculture when it invades and lowers the quality of a field crop, or competes for resources with the crop plants. It takes very few wild oat plants to cause a significant reduction in the yield of a wheat or cultivated oat field,  even though the seeds are a type of oat.

References

External links
Jepson Manual Treatment
Calphotos Photo gallery, University of California

fatua
Flora of Asia
Flora of Europe
Plants described in 1753
Taxa named by Carl Linnaeus